Ristiküla may refer to several places in Estonia:
Ristiküla, Lääne-Viru County, village in Vinni Parish, Lääne-Viru County
Ristiküla, Pärnu County, village in Surju Parish, Pärnu County

See also
Risti (disambiguation)